"Vill ha dej" (also spelled "Vill ha dig") is a 1980 single by Swedish synthpop group Freestyle. While being about love, the song also references school and school classes. Side B of the vinyl contains English-language versions of the songs on the A side. It reached number one in Svensktoppen for a five-week run.

Track listing
Side A
 "Vill ha dej" (3:40)
 "Kom till mej" (3:28)

Side B
 "I Want You" (3:30)
 "Isn't That Fine" (3:55)

Charts

Drömhus version

Swedish artist Drömhus (Therese Grankvist) released a cover version of the song as "Vill ha dig" in 1998. It was released as the second single from her debut album, Drömmar (Dreams) (1998), and peaked at #1 in Denmark, Norway and Sweden. The song also reached #3 in Finland and #30 on the Eurochart Hot 100 in June 1998.

Track listing
 CD single, Scandinavia (1998)
 "Vill ha dig" - 3:42 
 "Vill ha dig" (Extended) - 4:42 
 "Ja må hon leva" - 1:02

Charts

Weekly charts

Year-end charts

Other versions
The song was featured by Loreen in the 2004 Swedish Idol compilation Det bästa från Idol 2004.

In 2019, the song was covered by the Norwegian group Keiino.

References

External links 

 

1980 songs
1980 singles
1998 singles
Freestyle (Swedish band) songs
Songs written by Christer Sandelin
Swedish-language songs
Songs about school
Number-one singles in Denmark
Number-one singles in Norway
Number-one singles in Sweden